Victor David Akers, OBE (born 24 August 1946) is an English  football manager and former player who was most recently the assistant manager at Boreham Wood. As manager of Arsenal Ladies he became the club's most successful manager of all time winning 36 trophies from 1993 to 2009. In 1996 Akers became Arsenal's kit manager, a position he left subsequent to the departure of Arsène Wenger in 2018. As a player, he played as a left back.

Playing career
Born in Islington, London, Akers started his career in the youth set-up with Fulham but did not sign a professional contract with the club. He moved into non-league football with Tonbridge Angels (where his consistency at left-back meant that Malcolm Macdonald was forced to play as a left-footed right back, before converting to striker when he joined Luton Town.), before signing for Bexley United in May 1969. In July 1971 he signed for  Cambridge United for £5000, and was part of the side that claimed the club's first promotion season in 1973, from the old Fourth Division. He made 129 league appearances for Cambridge before joining Watford in July 1975 for a fee thought to be either £1000 or £2000. He was an ever-present for the first half of the club's first season back in the Fourth Division after relegation, making 22 league appearances as well as a further 4 in cup competitions. In July 1976 he joined Dartford for free, helping them win the Southern League Cup of 1977. He went on to play for Hayes in 1978, and by October 1980 had joined Slough Town winning a treble of Isthmian League Premier Division, Berks and Bucks Senior Cup and the Isthmian League Cup of 1981. By March 1984 he was playing for Carshalton Athletic where he spent two years at and away from Colston Avenue. Akers then joined Arsenal as the head of the club's community section.

Managerial career
Akers was appointed head of Arsenal's community section in 1986 and in 1987 founded the Arsenal Ladies team. He managed Arsenal Ladies to every major trophy in English women's football winning the FA Women's Cup eleven times, the FA Women's Premier League Cup ten times and the FA Women's Premier League eleven times. Akers, in so doing, attained five League and FA Women's Cup Doubles and four domestic Trebles. Akers also won the UEFA Women's Cup with Arsenal in 2007, being the first English side to do so. He retired in 2009 from the Arsenal Ladies post having won thirty-two major trophies in total. 

Akers was appointed Officer of the Order of the British Empire (OBE) in the 2010 New Year Honours for services to sport.

In May 2018, Akers retired as Arsenal's kit manager and was succeeded by his son, Paul.

In February 2019, Akers joined Boreham Wood as Assistant Manager. He left the role in August 2020.

Honours

Playing career
Cambridge United
Football League Fourth Division, promoted (in 3rd place) to Third Division: 1973

Dartford
Southern League Cup: 1977

Slough Town
Isthmian League Premier Division: 1981
Isthmian League Cup: 1981
Berks and Bucks Senior Cup:1981

Managerial career
Arsenal Ladies
UEFA Women's Cup: 2006–07
FA Women's Premier League: 1992–93, 1994–95, 1996–97, 2000–01, 2001–02, 2003–04, 2004–05, 2005–06, 2006–07, 2007–08, 2008–09
FA Women's Cup: 1992–93, 1994–95, 1997–98, 1998–99, 2000–01, 2003–04, 2005–06, 2006–07, 2007–08
FA Women's Premier League Cup: 1991–92, 1992–93, 1993–94, 1997–98, 1998–99, 1999–2000, 2000–01, 2004–05, 2006–07, 2008–09
FA Women's Community Shield: 2000, 2001, 2004, 2006, 2008

References

1946 births
Living people
Footballers from Islington (district)
English footballers
Association football fullbacks
Tonbridge Angels F.C. players
Bexley United F.C. players
Cambridge United F.C. players
Watford F.C. players
Dartford F.C. players
Hayes F.C. players
Slough Town F.C. players
Carshalton Athletic F.C. players
English Football League players
English football managers
Arsenal W.F.C. managers
Arsenal F.C. non-playing staff
Officers of the Order of the British Empire